Agosterol A is a bio-active sterol which may have applications in removing multi-drug resistance in various cancers. It was first isolated from marine sponge but has also been produced synthetically.

References

Sterols